The Des Plaines River Valley Bridge is a post-tensioned concrete girder toll bridge in the northeastern portion of the U.S. state of Illinois. It carries Interstate 355 (I-355) over the Des Plaines River, the Chicago Sanitary and Ship Canal, the Illinois and Michigan Canal, several railroad lines, Bluff Road, New Avenue and a forest preserve. It is officially named the Veterans Memorial Bridge. There are title plaques on the square pillars at the north and south entrances to the bridge.

A lower level bridge was also built for maintenance purposes, and to carry a bicycle trail that will connect other bicycle trails in the area. The height of the bridge allows the endangered Hine's Emerald Dragonfly to fly safely beneath the bridge, away from the flow of traffic.

References 

Interstate 55
Bridges on the Interstate Highway System
Road bridges in Illinois
Bridges completed in 2007
Toll bridges in Illinois
Concrete bridges in the United States
Girder bridges in the United States
Transportation buildings and structures in Cook County, Illinois
Transportation buildings and structures in Will County, Illinois